The 2003 Major League Lacrosse season was the third season of the league. The season began on May 31 and concluded with the championship game on August 24, 2003.

General information
Schedule was reduced from 14 to 12 games.

Baltimore moved their games to Homewood Field. Long Island moved theirs to Mitchel Athletic Complex and Rochester moved theirs to Bishop Kearney Field.

August 17: The first-ever cancellation of an MLL game occurred when rains forced the Baltimore Bayhawks and Long Island Lizards to cancel their game at Mitchel Field.

The league signed a national television agreement with ESPN2.

Regular season
W = Wins, L = Losses, PCT= Winning Percentage, PF= Points For, PA = Points Against

*The August 17 game between Baltimore at Long Island was canceled due to weather.

All Star Game
July 17, 2003
National 27-12 American at Mitchel Athletic Complex, Uniondale, New York, Gary Gait MVP

Playoffs
Semifinals August 22, 2003
 Baltimore 15-13 New Jersey @  Villanova Stadium, Villanova, Pennsylvania
Long Island 20-14 Boston @  Villanova Stadium, Villanova, Pennsylvania

MLL Championship August 24, 2003
Long Island 15-14 (OT) Baltimore @  Villanova Stadium, Villanova, Pennsylvania

Bracket
*overtime

Awards

Annual

Weekly Awards
The MLL gave out awards weekly for the best offensive player, best defensive player and best rookie.

3
Major League Lacrosse
Lacrosse